NHS National Workforce Projects was part of the English National Health Service (NHS). It provided support to all NHS organisations in planning their workforce to ensure they had the right staff in the right jobs to provide care to patients.

The NHS National Workforce Projects team was formed in 2005 to create and make available a range of workforce planning tools, guidance and resources to the NHS. The organisation also led on supporting the NHS prepare for the European Working Time Directive where the maximum working hours that junior doctors work will reduce from 58 to 48 hours a week in August 2009.

Following a review of hosted bodies in the NHS in 2007, it was decided that the organisation was surplus to the requirements of the health service save for the Working Time Directive element, which was itself transferred out of the NHS and into Skills for Health.

National Health Service (England)
2005 establishments in the United Kingdom
Government agencies established in 2005